Morningside High School is a public high school in Inglewood, California. It is the second largest high school after Inglewood High School in the city.

History
In 1951, the first two classes of students came to the Morningside Park area of Inglewood to attend the new Morningside High School. Incoming 9th graders came from the surrounding junior high schools, and a class of 10th graders transferred to Morningside from Inglewood High School. Some of Inglewood High School's faculty transferred as well, including A. John Waldmann, the first principal of Morningside High School.

In popular culture
In 1993, Wesley Snipes narrated the documentary, Hardwood Dreams, following five MHS seniors during their last high school basketball season as they dreamt of the National Basketball Association.  Ten years later, Snipes narrated the 2004 TV sequel, Hardwood Dreams: Ten Years Later.

Chris Gaines was a fictional MHS student and alternative rock musician, developed by Garth Brooks in 1999 for a proposed movie.

Notable alumni

 Roberta Achtenberg: Assistant Secretary of HUD under President Bill Clinton
 John Arrillaga: real estate investor
 John Bahler:  musical arranger and director, including Michael Jackson, Elvis Presley, and Barbra Streisand
 Tom Bahler: singer, arranger and producer, including Brian Setzer, The Partridge Family, and Neil Diamond
 Bobbie Bass:  Hollywood stuntman,  TV and movie extra, including Star Trek: The Original Series; stepfather to Bo Derek.
 Boris Cabrera (1999): former actor
 Elden Campbell:  professional basketball player who played center for Los Angeles Lakers and 2004 NBA champion Detroit Pistons
 Jackie Goldberg: politician, teacher (Compton Unified School District), former member of California State Assembly and Los Angeles City Council, former president of Los Angeles School Board
 Flo Hyman (d. 1986): volleyball player, Olympic silver medalist
 Charles Jordan: football player, Los Angeles Raiders, Green Bay Packers, Miami Dolphins, Seattle Seahawks
 Tom Nardini: film and television actor, appeared in Cat Ballou (1965), Africa Texas Style (1967), and TV series Cowboy in Africa (1967–68)
 Vicki Lawrence (1967): singer, including The Night The Lights Went Out In Georgia and for The Young Americans touring musical group; appeared in feature film The Young Americans, which won Academy Award for Best Documentary; actress, including The Carol Burnett Show and Mama's Family; won 2004 TV Land Award and 1976 Emmy Award; nominee Golden Globe Award; nominee Daytime Emmy Award; game show panelist
 Jim Lefebvre: Major League Baseball player (Los Angeles Dodgers 1965-72), coach (Dodgers, Oakland Athletics, San Francisco Giants, Cincinnati Reds, Milwaukee Brewers) and manager (Seattle Mariners, Chicago Cubs, Brewers and China National Team, 2008 Olympics). Lefebvre also played for the Lotte Orions in the Japanese League from 1972-77.
 Lisa Leslie: basketball player for USC and WNBA; actress, Wilhelmina supermodel; 1996, 2000 and 2004 Olympic gold medalist, 2-time WNBA champion, 3-time MVP and 8-time All-Star, 2015 inductee in Basketball Hall of Fame
 David Levy, Ph.D.: psychologist, author, speaker; actor in 1970's TV show Wonderbug
 Stan Love: NBA basketball player with Washington Bullets and Los Angeles Lakers, brother of Beach Boys lead singer Mike Love and first cousin of Brian Wilson, Dennis Wilson and Carl Wilson, father of Cleveland Cavaliers basketball player Kevin Love, 2007 Gatorade HS Male Athlete of the Year
DeWayne "Blackbyrd" McKnight: American guitarist and music director, Rock & Roll Hall of Fame Inductee, Herbie Hancock's Headhunters, Miles Davis, Funkadelic/P-Funk' Red Hot Chili Peppers
 Carolyn Mitchell (née Barbara Ann Thomason): actress, wife of Mickey Rooney
 Jim Photoglo: songwriter, including Nitty Gritty Dirt Band hit "Fishin' in the Dark"; wrote songs recorded by Marty Robbins, Everly Brothers, Brenda Lee, Dusty Springfield, Garth Brooks, Faith Hill, Travis Tritt, Patty Loveless; musician, including opened for the Beach Boys, toured as singer/musician with Dan Fogelberg, Vince Gill, Nicolette Larson, Kathy Mattea and Wendy Waldman
 Curren Price: Los Angeles City Councilman beginning in 2013, Price previously served as the Assemblyman for the 51st district of the California State Assembly from 2006 to 2009 before serving in the California State Senate from 2009 to 2013; previously Inglewood City Councilman; ran unsuccessfully for Inglewood mayor (1997)
 Byron Scott: head coach of four NBA teams and three-time champion as player with Los Angeles Lakers
 Danny Tabor, mayor of Inglewood, California
 Tina Thompson: basketball player for USC and WNBA, 2004 and 2008 Olympics gold medalist; 4-time WNBA champion and 9-time All-Star
 Lisa Wu: Television personality, The Real Housewives of Atlanta & Hollywood Divas.

Notable faculty
 Jim Harrick: coached basketball at Pepperdine University, UCLA, University of Rhode Island, University of Georgia, Utah State University
Phyllis Love, Hollywood and Broadway actress; taught drama and English

See also
Hardwood Dreams
Hardwood Dreams: Ten Years Later

References

External links
 

High schools in Los Angeles County, California
Public high schools in California
Schools in Inglewood, California
Educational institutions established in 1951
1951 establishments in California